Francophone nationalism refers to nationalism of Francophone peoples and societies involving a theme of the French language as a component of it.

Examples
Acadian nationalism
French nationalism
Métis nationalism
Quebec nationalism